The Speaker of Selangor State Legislative Assembly is the presiding officer in the Selangor State Legislative Assembly.

The speaker is selected through ballot in the first session of a new legislative assembly.

List of speakers

Source:

References 

Selangor State Legislative Assembly
Politics of Selangor
Government of Selangor